Kottayam Santha  was an Indian actress and dubbing artist best known for her work in Malayalam cinema. She has acted in more than 300 films. She had also acted in several TV serials like Valayam, Krishnakripasagaram etc. She dubbed for almost 1000 films. She was the voice for Seema in almost all her Malayalam films.

Biography
Kottayam Santha was born at Kottayam. She entered the cinema field through M Krishnan Nair's film Aniyathi. She was the founder and chief patron of Sthree Sakthi Samajam, a women's rights protection organisation. She died on 27 April 2007.

Filmography

As an actress

Prajapathi (2006) as Guest role
Mukhamariyaathe (2006) as Thampuratti
 Palunku (2006) as Ammayi
 Jalolsavam(2004) as Jose's mother
 Kasthoorimaan (2003) as Sajan's grandmother
 Ladies & Gentlemen (2001) as Mrs.Perera
Stalin Sivadas (1999) as Manju's mother
Kaliveedu (1996) as Dr. Gonzales's mother 
Swarnachamaram (1996)
Easwaramoorthy IN (1996) as Ramesh's mother
Kanjirapally Kariyachan (1996) as Kuttappayi's mother
 Boxer (1995) as Jimmy's mother
 Pakshe (1994) as Nandini's mother
Commissioner (1994) as Indu's mother
Manichitrathazhu (1993) as Mother Superior
 Oru Kochu Bhoomikulukkam (1992) as Viji's mother
 Manyanmar (1992) as Thomas's mother
 Abhayam (1991)
 Pavam Pavam Rajakumaran (1990) as Gopalakrishnan's mother
Ezhuthappurangal (1987)
 Vivaahithare Ithile (1986)
 Vellam (1985)
 Ozhivukaalam (1985) as Das's mother
 Rangam (1985) as Matron
 Thammil Thammil (1985) as Dr. Susan
 Oru Nokku Kanan (1985) as Sister Agnes
 Manassariyathe (1984) as Mohan's mother
 Oru Kochu Swapnam (1984) as Matron
 Ente Upasana (1984) as Mother Superior
 Manase Ninakku Mangalam (1984) as Damodara Kuruppu's sister
 Aattuvanchi Ulanjappol (1984) as Rohiniyamma
 Chakkarayumma (1984)
 Iniyenkilum (1983) as Saraswathy
 Shesham Kazhchayil (1983) as Swimmer's wife
 Bandham (1983)
 Koodevide (1983) as Captain Thomas's mother
 Oru Kunju Janikkunnu - Mathrika Kudumbam (1982)
 Ankuram (1982)
 Velicham Vitharunna Penkutty (1982)
 Ente Shathrukkal/Porattam (1982)
 Ruby My Darling (1982)
 Ellam Ninakku Vendi (1981) as Bharathi
 Kilinjalgal (1981) as Mrs.Thomas Tamil film
 Rajneegandhi (1980)
 Meen (1980) as Thresia
 Chandrabhimbham (1980)
 Swargadevatha (1980)
 Ithikkarappakki (1980)
 Aaravam (1980) as Mrs.Murukayya
 Ethikkara Pakky (1980) as Kalyani
 Kannukal (1979) as Karthyayani
 Idavazhiyile Poocha Mindapoocha (1979) as Cheriyamma
 Sarapanjaram (1979) as Lakshmiyamma
 Anubhavangale Nandi  (1979)
 Kathirmandapam (1979)
 Lovely (1979)
 Iniyum Kaanaam (1979) as Parvathiyamma
 Eeta (1978)
 Nivedyam (1978)
 Nakshathrangale Kaaval (1978)
 Snehathinte Mukhangal (1978) as Lakshmi's mother
 Aaravam (1978) as Murukayya's wife
 Balapareekshanam (1978) as Raji's mother
 Avar Jeevikkunnu (1978)
 Adimakkachavadam (1978)
 Puthariyankam (1978)
 Agninakshathram (1977)
 Rathimanmadhan (1977)
 Anthardhaaham (1977) as Valyamma
 Yatheem (1977)
 Nadeenadanmaare Aavasyamundu (1974)
 Baalya Prathijna (Purusharathnam) (1972) as Ammini
Theerthayathra (1972)
 Sthree (1970) as Naaniyamma
 Ambalapraavu (1970) as Nani Amma
 Priya (1970)
 Abhayam (1970) as Devakiyamma
 Nizhalattam (1970) as Mrs. Nair
 Aa Chithrashalabham Parannotte (1970)
 Amma Enna Sthree
 Anadha (1970)
 Kallichellamma (1969)
 Kattu Kurangu (1969)
 Vila Kuranja Manushyan (1969)
 Viruthan Shanku (1968) as Nanukutty
 Padunna Puzha (1968) as Radhamma
 Manswini (1968) as Alamelu
 N.G.O (1967)
 Awal (1967)
 Pareeksha (1967)
 Anveshichu Kandethiyilla (1967) as Cheriyamma
 Bhagyamudra (1967)
 Sthanarthi Saramma (1966)
 Chemmeen (1966)
 Kalithozhan (1966)
 Muthalali (1965) as Meenakshi
 Kochumon (1965) as Meena
 Rajamalli (1965) as Manka
 Bhargavi Nilayam (1964) as Suma
 Aadya Kiranagal (1964) as Vasanthy 
 Ammaye Kaanaan (1963) as Janaki Amma
 Moodupadam (1963)
 Ninamaninja Kalpadukal (1963) as Lisy
 Doctor (1963)
 Jnaanasundari (1961) as Melitta
Mariakutty (1958) as Mariakutty's friend
Jailppulli (1957) as Lakshmi
 Paadatha Painkili (1957)
 Manthravadi (1956)
Aniyathi (1955)

As a singer
 Padathalir Thozhunnen ...(Sabarimala Ayyappan, 1961)
 Kannukalil Kavanayumaay ...(Bhaagyajaathakam, 1962)
 Keledi Ninne Njaan ...(Doctor, 1963)
 Malaranikkaadukal ...	(Ramanan, 1967)
 Kaalamenna Kaaranavarkku ...(Kallichellamma, 1969)
 Ambambo Jeevikkan ...(Naalumanippookkal, 1978)

As a dubbing artist

 Sindhu (1979) Jayabharathi
 Utsavam (1975) Jayabharathi 
 Mohiniyattam (1976) Lakshmi
 Angeekaram (1977) Prameela
 Sarapancharam (1977) Jayabharathi
 Swarangal Swapnangal  (1978) Jayabharathi 
 Marmmaram (1983) Jayabharathi 
 Chandhrahasam (1979) Jayabharathi 
 Dhanya (1978) Jayabharathi 
 Shikharangal (1979) Jayabharathi 
 Nadhi Muthal Nadhi Vare (1983) Jayabharathi 
 Tholkkan Enikku Manassilla  (1981) Jayabharathi 
 America America( 1986) Jayabharathi 
 Panchamrutham(1978) Jayabharathi 
 Rugma (1984) Jayabharathi 
 Anubandham (1985) Jayabharathi 
 Vartha (1986) Jayabharathi 
 Akkareyanente Manasam (1985) Jayabharathi 
 Sindhoora Sandhyakku Mounam (1986) Jayabharathi 
 Sandhyakku Virinja Poovu (1984) Jayabharathi 
 Oru Kochu Swapnam (1984) Jayabharathi 
 Anujathi (1977)Jayabharathi 
 Mukthi (1994) Jayabharathi 
 Snehikkan Samayamilla  (1981) Jayabharathi 
 Moorkhan (1981) Jayabharathi 
 Aavanazhi (1986) Jayabharathi 
 Choodatha Pookkal (1985) Jayabharathi 
 Athirathram(1984)Jayabharathi 
 Vasanthasena (1995) Jayabharathi 
 Adiyozhukkukal (1995) Jayabharathi 
 Adimakal Udamakal (1996) Jayabharathi 
 Lakshmana Rekha (1984) Jayabharathi 
 Thirakkil Alpa Samayam (1994) Jayabharathi 
 Manushyamrugam (1981) Jayabharathi 
 Ormayilennum(1984) Jayabharathi 
 Abkari (1996) Jayabharathi 
 Mattoral (1995) Jayabharathi 
 Naanayam (1986) Jayabharathi 
 Iniyenkilum (1986) Jayabharathi 
 Ithrayum Kaalam (1985) Jayabharathi 
 Shathrusamharam (1980) Jayabharathi 
 Chuvanna Chirakukal (1978) Jayabharathi 
 Panchapandavar (1983) Jayabharathi 
 Gangster (1981) Jayabharathi 
An Evening in Paris (1983) Jayabharathi 
Garjanam (1983) Jayabharathi 
Benz Vasu  (1981) Jayabharathi 
Thusharam (1982) Jayabharathi 
John JafarJanarthanan (1984) Jayabharathi 
Vishwaroopam  (1986) Jayabharathi 
Eeta  (1978) Jayabharathi 
Angadi  (1981) Jayabharathi 
Sakthi (1980) Jayabharathi 
Kaanamarayathu (1985) Jayabharathi 
Karimbana (1979) Jayabharathi 
Njan Njan Maathram  (1980) Jaya bharathi
Meen (1980) Jayabharathi 
Vicharana (1994) Jayabharathi 
Innalenkill Naale (1986) Jayabharathi 
1921 (1984) Jayabharathi 
Ahimsa (1983) Jayabharathi 
Chaakara (1981) Jayabharathi 
Karimpoovinakkare (1986) Jayabharathi 
Ezham Kadalinakkare (1980) Jayabharathi 
Thadakom (1983) Jayabharathi 
Deepam (1981) Jayabharathi 
Soothrakkari  (1979) Jayabharathi 
Adavukal 18 (1979) Jayabharathi 
Manasa Vacha Karmana  (1978) Jayabharathi 
Sathyam (1980) Jayabharathi 
Anthapuram  (1978) Jayabharathi 
Ammayum Makalum (1980) Jayabharathi 
Theenalangal (1981) Jayabharathi 
Aashirvadam (1983) Jayabharathi 
Kappal kairali  (1983) Jayabharathi 
Komaram (1983) Jayabharathi 
Sankharsham (1983) Jayabharathi 
Sphodanam (1978) Jayabharathi 
Maniyara (1983) Jayabharathi 
Manassoru Mahaasamudram (1978) Jayabharathi 
Nishedi (1984) Jayabharathi 
Kodathi  (1984) Jayabharathi 
Ivide Ingane (1995) Jayabharathi 
Oru Smangaliyude Kadha (1984) Jayabharathi 
Sandharbham  (1994) Jayabharathi 
Janakeeya Kodathi  (1995) Jayabharathi 
Guruji Oru Vaakku (1994) Jayabharathi 
Pappan Priyapetta Pappan (1986) Jayabharathi 
Njan Kathorthirikkam  (1996) Jayabharathi 
Ashtabandham (1997) Jayabharathi 
Ente Sabdham (1997) Jayabharathi 
Koodanayum Kaattu (1996) Jayabharathi 
Ee kaikalil  (1995) Jayabharathi 
Iniyethra Dooram  (1984) Jayabharathi 
Naalkkavala  (1994) Jayabharathi 
Sarvakalashala (1996) Jayabharathi 
Ayitham  (1984) Jayabharathi 
Mahayanam (1984) Jayabharathi 
Puthiya Velicham  (1978) Jayabharathi 
Kaamini  (1978) Jayabharathi 
Thettu (1977) Jayabharathi 
Sooryavamsham  (1979) Jayabharathi 
Pichathy Kuttappan  (1979) Jayabharathi 
Kaavilamma  (1977) Jayabharathi 
Agnipareekshanam  (1980) Jayabharathi 
Ladies hostel  (1979) Jayabharathi 
Anubhoothikalude Nimisham  (1979) Jayabharathi 
Pattalam Janaki (1979) Jayabharathi 
Azhakulka Celina  (1978) Jayabharathi 
Madhuram Thirumadhuram  (1979) Jayabharathi 
Achani  (1979) Jayabharathi 
Abhayam Thedi (1986) Jayabharathi 
Ivanente Priyaputhran  (1979) Jayabharathi 
Sandhyaragam (1979) Jayabharathi 
Pushyaraagam  (1979) Jayabharathi 
Raathriyile yathrakkar  (1979) Jayabharathi 
Jumbulingam (1979) Jayabharathi 
Avakasham (1979) Jayabharathi 
Orkkuka Vallappozhum  (1981) Jayabharathi 
Ente Sathrukkal  (1986) Jayabharathi 
Poonthenaruvi (1979) Nandhitha Bose 
Thadavara (1982) Nandhitha Bose  
Vidaparayum Munpe (1984) Jayabharathi  
Orikkal Koodi (1985) Jayabharathi

TV serials
 Valayam
 Eka Tharakam
 Manasi
 Punarjanmam
 Meera
 Agnisakshi
 Manalnagaram

Dramas
 Manushyan

External links

Kottayam Shantha at MSI (MalayalaSangeetham.Info)

References

Actresses in Malayalam cinema
Indian film actresses
Actresses from Kottayam
Indian voice actresses
2007 deaths
Year of birth missing
20th-century Indian actresses
Actresses in Malayalam television
Actresses in Tamil cinema